Leonard Neidorf (born ) is an American philologist who is Professor of English at Nanjing University. Neidorf specializes in the study of Old English and Middle English literature, and is a known authority on Beowulf.

Biography
Raised in Voorhees Township, New Jersey, Neidorf graduated from Eastern Regional High School in 2006. He gained a BA, summa cum laude, in English from New York University in 2010, and a PhD in English from Harvard University in 2014. Upon gaining his PhD, Neidorf became a member of the Harvard Society of Fellows (2014-2016). Admittance to the Harvard Society of Fellows is considered one of the greatest academic achievements possible in the United States. Since 2016, Neidorf has been Professor of English at Nanjing University.

Research
Leonard Neidorf specializes in the study of Old English and Middle English literature. He is known as an authority on Beowulf. Neidorf is the author of The Art and Thought of the Beowulf Poet (2022) and The Transmission of Beowulf: Language, Culture, and Scribal Behavior (2017). Neidorf is the editor of The Dating of Beowulf: A Reassessment (2014), which was awarded the Outstanding Academic Title by Choice in 2015, and co-editor (with Tom Shippey and Rafael J. Pascual) of Old English Philology: Studies in Honour of R.D. Fulk (2016). Neidorf maintains that Beowulf was probably composed by a single author in the late 7th or early 8th century AD. For his research on Beowulf, Neidorf was awarded the Beatrice White Prize from the English Association in 2020. In addition to Beowulf, Neidorf has published extensively on other major Old English poems, including Widsith, Maxims, the Finnesburg Fragment, and the Dream of the Rood. His research addresses questions of authorship, interpretation, literary history, and textual criticism. In addition to his traditional philological research, Neidorf has published several large-scale quantitive studies of the corpus of Old English poetry.

Neidorf's studies of Beowulf situate the poem in a wide variety of contexts. He explicates its text in relation to Old Norse and Middle High German analogues, medieval traditions concerning the monstrous progeny of Cain, and early English history and culture. In his studies of the Beowulf manuscript, Neidorf uses transcription errors in the transmitted text to extract information about the poem's textual history. He argues that patterns of error in the extant manuscript indicate that the poem existed in written form before the middle of the eighth century. In the field of onomastics, Neidorf contends that names in Beowulf derive from earlier oral tradition and were not invented by the poet to reflect meaningfully on their bearers. In the field of Old English meter, Neidorf defends the metrical theories of Eduard Sievers and Robert D. Fulk. He argues for the utility of meter as a tool in the editing and dating of Old English poetry. In his methodological writing, Neidorf draws on the epistemology of Karl Popper and argues for the importance of falsifiability and probabilism in literary studies.

Selected works
 The Dating of Beowulf: A Reassessment, 2014
 Old English Philology: Studies in Honour of R.D. Fulk, 2016
 The Transmission of Beowulf: Language, Culture, and Scribal Behavior, 2017

See also
 Robert D. Fulk
 J. R. R. Tolkien
 Tom Shippey
 Andrew Breeze
 Geoffrey Russom

References

External links
 Leonard Neidorf at the website of Harvard University
 Leonard Neidorf at Academia.edu
 Leonard Neidorf at ResearchGate
 Leonard Neidorf at Google Scholar

American philologists
Anglo-Saxon studies scholars
Eastern Regional High School alumni
Germanic studies scholars
Harvard University alumni
Harvard University faculty
Living people
Academic staff of Nanjing University
New York University alumni
People from Voorhees Township, New Jersey
Year of birth missing (living people)